Blossoming Flowers (literally "flower baby blossoming") also known as Super Flowers Girl was an annual national Chinese singing contest for female contestants, organized by Qinghai Satellite Television between 2010. It was generally described as the Qinghai version of Super Girl and becoming another popular entertainment shows in the country. The singing contest will have air its second season in March 2011.

Outline
Partly inspired by the many spinoffs of the Hunan Satellite Television's Super Girl, the competition was open to any female contestant from ages 18 through 32 regardless of her origin, appearance, or how she sings. Many applicants travelled long distances to take part in the competition hoping to become a star. Each contestant was allowed 30 seconds to perform in front of judges and find out if they were selected for the preliminary regional rounds.

Following the selection of contestants in the five regions, the competition began with the preliminary rounds. Preliminaries were held in each of the five locations where auditions were located. Television viewers were able to watch each of the preliminaries and vote for their favorite singers. Voting was conducted by telephone and text messaging.

The regional preliminaries were followed by a weekly broadcast knockout competition held in Xining, Qinghai province. Viewers called in to vote for their favourite singers, and the weakest two—as voted by the judges and the audience's weekly SMS— faced-off subsequently in a PK, short for Player Kill. The term is derived from kill-or-be-killed multiplayer online games. The singer with the fewest votes was then eliminated.

Season summary

2010 season
The first season of Blossoming Flowers aired from March 21. The finale is scheduled for early-September.

 Champion
 Flower girl
 Eliminated

Final contestants
 02 Momo Mo Longdan (莫龙丹) - Shenyang Area  - 1st place (Champion)
 04 Cai Tingyu (蔡婷玉) - Zhengzhou Area  - 2nd place (1st Runner-up)
 05 Villi Li Hui (李慧) - Guangzhou Area - 3rd place (2nd Runner-up)
 09 Yang Xiucuo (杨秀措) - Xining Area  - 4th place
 07 River Dai Yue (代悦) - Chengdu Area  - 5th place
 06 Ma Yiru (马沂茹) - Online (Chongqing) Area  - 6th place
 03 Lulu Li Yanglu (李杨璐) - Xining Area - 7th place
 10 Teng Siyu (滕偲玙) - Chengdu Area - 8th place
 08 Wendy Xie Wenting (谢文婷) - Changsha Area - 9th place
 01 Lu Yudi (卢昱弟) - Shenyang Area - 10th place

See also
Idol series
Super Boy
Super Girl
The Voice

References

External links
Official
Qinghai TV 2010 Blossoming Flowers official site
Qinghai TV 2011 Blossoming Flowers official site

Singing talent shows
Chinese music television series
Mandopop
2010 Chinese television series debuts